The Luzon boobook or Luzon hawk-owl (Ninox philippensis) is a species of owl in the family Strigidae. It is endemic to the Philippines where it lives in forests. It is a brown and white mottled bird and males and females look much alike.

Description

The Luzon boobook is one of the smallest of the owls in the Philippine hawk-owl complex. It has white eyebrow-like streaks above the eyes and the beak and a white moustache forming an x-shape on the head. It does not have tufts of feathers on its head resembling ears. The upper parts of all subspecies are brown and the wings are mottled with oval-shaped white spots. The tail is dark brown with narrow white stripes. The sides of the head are brown, the chin is a whitish colour, while the rest of the underparts are pale white with wide brown streaks which are more prominent on the breast. The underside of the tail is white. The chequered subspecies have these reticulated patterns on the underparts, on the head, the upper parts of the back and the wings. The feet are partially covered with feathers and are pale yellow. The beak is olive.

Systematics and taxonomy
There are three recognised subspecies:
 Ninox philippensis centralis (Bohol, Boracay, Carabao, Guimaras, Negros, Panay, Semirara and Siquijor)
 Ninox philippensis philippensis (Biliran, Buad, Catanduanes, Leyte, Luzon, Marinduque, Polillo and Samar)
 Ninox philippensis ticaoensis (Ticao)

Ecology
Its natural habitats are subtropical or tropical moist lowland forests and subtropical or tropical moist montane forests. The breeding season for this species starts around February utilizing hollows in trees as nesting sites. It feeds on insects and small rodents.

Conservation Status
They are locally common within that range and the population size is believed to be stable. The owls face no particular threats, and as a result, the IUCN has listed the group as being of "least concern" as  it is also tolerant of secondary forest and clearings.

References

Further reading

 Kennedy, R.S., Gonzales P.C., Dickinson E.C., Miranda, Jr, H.C., Fisher T.H. (2000) A Guide to the Birds of the Philippines, Oxford University Press, Oxford.

Luzon hawk-owl
Birds of Luzon
Luzon boobook
Luzon boobook
Luzon boobook